György Szabad (4 August 1924 – 3 July 2015) was a Hungarian politician and historian, founder member of the Hungarian Democratic Forum (MDF). He was the Speaker of the National Assembly of Hungary between 1990 and 1994. He was a member of the Batthyány Society of Professors.

Personal life
His first wife was Judit Szegő. After their divorce he married Andrea Suján. He had a daughter, Júlia from his second marriage.

Death
He died on 3 July 2015 at the age of 90.

Honours and awards

Publications
A tatai és gesztesi Esterházy-uradalom (1957)
Forradalom és kiegyezés válaszútján 1860–61 (1967)
Hungarian Political Trends… 1849–1867 (1977)
Kossuth politikai pályája (1977)
Az önkényuralom kora 1849–1867 (1979)
Miért halt meg Teleki László? (1985)
Magyarország önálló államiságának kérdése a polgári átalakulás korában (1986)
A zsellérilletmény (1987)
A kormány parlamenti felelősségének kérdése (1998)
The Conceptualization of a Danubian Federation (1999)
A parlamentáris kormányzati rendszer megteremtése, védelmezése, és kockáztatása Magyarországon 1848–1867 (2000)
Kossuth irányadása (2002)
Egy történész „aforizmáiból” (2005)

References

MTI Ki Kicsoda 2009, Magyar Távirati Iroda Zrt., Budapest, 2008, 1017. old., ISSN 1787-288X
Adatlap a Magyar Tudományos Akadémia honlapján
Szabad György 1996-os országgyűlési életrajza
György Szabad passed away, index.hu, 3 July 2015 

20th-century Hungarian historians
Speakers of the National Assembly of Hungary
Members of the National Assembly of Hungary (1990–1994)
Members of the National Assembly of Hungary (1994–1998)
1924 births
2015 deaths
Hungarian Jews
21st-century Hungarian historians

Grand Crosses of the Order of Merit of the Republic of Hungary (civil)